Eyre Mountains/Taka Ra Haka Conservation Park is a protected area and mountain range in the Southland District and Southland Region of New Zealand's South Island.

Geography

History

The park was established in 2005.

References

Forest parks of New Zealand
Protected areas of Southland, New Zealand
Landforms of Southland, New Zealand
Southland District
2005 establishments in New Zealand
Protected areas established in 2005